The 2009–10 season is the results of Al Ain Club in all matches.

Al Ain Club began this season by winning the Super Cup. To continue his career at winning competitions, after a Great achievement in last season, at winning two titles in two weeks., Etisalat Emirates Cup and UAE President Cup.

During the summer transfer window, Al Ain Club signing with Emerson for 2 years from Flamengo, and with the player Jose Sand from Lanús at $10 million for 4 years, Also signed a contract with Ittihad kalba goalkeeper Yousef Abdulrahman at $10 million for 5 years .

On 18 January, During The winter transfer window opened, Al Ain Club signing the Asian foreigner and the four professional player in the team Lee Ho from Seongnam Ilhwa Chunma till the end of the season, and he was given the number 50.

Current squad

Starting 11

Transfers

Summer 2009

winter 2010

From youth system

Out

 ( On loan to Raja Casablanca)

Squad stats

Managerial changes

During the season

UAE Pro-League

Results
Kickoff times are in UTC.

Results by round

Results summary

League standings

Etisalat Emirates Cup

Results
Kickoff times are in UTC.

Semi-finals

1st Legs

2nd Legs

Group B

UAE President Cup

Results
Kickoff times are in UTC.

Friendly matches

UAE-Germany Super Cup

Results
Kickoff time are in UAE.

2010 AFC Champions League

Results

Group C

References

External links
 Al Ain FC official website 
 ZaimUae Fans 
 Goalzz.com: Al Ain Club Page 
 Kooora.com: Al Ain Club Page 

2009-10
Emirati football clubs 2009–10 seasons